Konstantin Stepanov (born 26 September 1983) is a Russian professional pool player. In 2002 he was the Russian 8-ball champion. During the 2006 WPA Men's World Nine-ball Championship he survived the group stages, the round of 64 and the round of 32, but was eliminated in the round of 16 by Ralf Souquet. This performance secured him a spot in the 2007 edition of the event. He was a banner member of the Russian World Team Pool Cup in 2010.

Titles 
 Mosconi Cup (2007)
 Euro Tour
 Italy Open (2013)
 North Cyprus Open (2013)
 European Pool Championship 
 Eight-Ball (2010)
 Russian Pool Championship
 Straight Pool (2008, 2009, 2011, 2014, 2016, 2020)
 Nine-Ball (2007, 2008, 2011, 2012, 2015, 2017)
 Ten-Ball (2015, 2016)
 Eight-Ball (2009)

References 

Living people
1983 births
Russian pool players
Place of birth missing (living people)